Simen Holand Pettersen (born 8 April 1998) is a Norwegian handball player for Skjern Håndbold and the Norwegian national team.

He represented Norway at the 2021 World Men's Handball Championship.

He is a son of handball coach and former handball player Gunnar Pettersen.

References

External links
 
 
 
 

1998 births
Living people
Norwegian male handball players
Sportspeople from Tønsberg
Expatriate handball players
Norwegian expatriate sportspeople in France
Handball players at the 2020 Summer Olympics
Olympic handball players of Norway